Vikedal, alternately spelled Vikadal, may refer to:

Places
Vikedal, a village in Vindafjord municipality, Rogaland county, Norway
Vikedal (municipality), a former municipality in Rogaland county, Norway
Vikedal Church, a church in Vindafjord municipality, Rogaland county, Norway
Vikadal, Vestland (also spelled Vikedal), a village in Kvam municipality, Vestland county, Norway

People
Ryan Vikedal, a former member of the band Nickelback